John George Hughes (30 January 1935 – 19 August 1994) was the ninth area Bishop of Kensington.

Hughes was educated at Queens' College, Cambridge. Ordained in 1961, he began his ministry as a curate in Brighouse and was then, successively, vicar of St John's Clifton, Director of Education in the Diocese of Wakefield, secretary of the Advisory Council for the Church's Ministry and warden of St. Michael's College, Llandaff, before being ordained to the episcopate – a position he held from 1987 until his death in August 1994, aged 59.

The current Archbishop of Canterbury, Justin Welby, was at first rejected for ordination by Hughes, who told Welby that "There is no place for you in the Church of England."

References

1935 births
Alumni of Queens' College, Cambridge
Bishops of Kensington
1994 deaths
Wardens of St Michael's College, Llandaff